The 2021–22 TSV Havelse season was the 110th season in the football club's history and first in the 3. Liga, the third flight of German football. TSV Havelse will also participate in this season's edition of the Lower Saxony Cup. This is the first season for Havelse in the HDI-Arena, located in Hanover, Lower Saxony, Germany, since their home stadium, the Wilhelm-Langrehr-Stadion in Garbsen, did not meet 3. Liga standards.

Players

Squad information

Transfers

In

Out

Friendly matches

Competitions

Overview

3. Liga

League table

Results summary

Results by round

Matches

Lower Saxony Cup

Statistics

Appearances and goals

|}

Goalscorers

Clean sheets

Disciplinary record

References

TSV Havelse seasons
Havelse, Tsv